Only You (Traditional Chinese: 只有您) is a 2011 Hong Kong television drama that was aired on Hong Kong's TVB Jade and TVB HD Jade channels. The drama began broadcast on 21 February 2011 and ran for 30 episodes. It stars Louise Lee, Yoyo Mung and Kevin Cheng as the main leads.

A Television Broadcasts Limited (TVB) production, the drama is written by Choi Ting-ting and Wong Yuk-tang, with Amy Wong serving as the executive producer. Only You is set in modern-day Hong Kong and centers on the wedding planners working under Only You Wedding Services and bridal shop agency. Twelve different stories are told in an episode format regarding the agency's clients.

Synopsis
An unrelenting and boastful woman, Mandy (Yoyo Mung) wants to be a wedding planner after she gets the axe, simply for its simple job nature and attractive income. Sze-tim (Louise Lee), an expert in the trade and a person of principles, declines to take her as a student as she sees through Mandy's motive, but Mandy will not yield. She tries her best to please Sze-tim's younger brother, Sze-chai (Mak Cheung-ching) and his wife, Phoebe (Kristal Tin) who employ her as a coordinator in their bridal wear company.

Mandy is determined to do something big in her career, but the appearance of photographer, Summer (Kevin Cheng) makes her rethink the meaning of life. Mandy and Summer have met all kinds of people at work, from couples in quarrel to couples in distress, neurotic brides to lovers with disabilities. Every couple has a unique love story to tell; in front of Mandy and Summer they exchange wedding vows in an atmosphere of beauty and serenity.

Although Mandy and Summer love each other, their different outlook on life begins to tear them apart. Should lovers stand firm with principles or let go for love?

Stories
Hard on the Sister-in-law (難為大姑奶)
My Despicable Ex-boyfriend (我的賤格前男友)
Ex-convict's Wedding (釋囚的婚禮)
Amazing Love (驚情)
I Have a Dream (我有一個夢想)
Perfection of Deformity (殘缺的完美)
Her Husband is a Boss (佢老公系大佬)
A Wealthy Family's Wedding (豪門婚禮)
Mom, I'm Getting Married (媽媽我嫁了)
My Indian Father-in-law (我的印度老爺)
The Last Wedding (最後的花嫁)
Dreams of the Closing Year (暮年之夢)

Cast

Louise Lee as Chong Sze-tim, Only You's matchmaker.
Yoyo Mung as Mandy "Ah Man" Mak, Only You's assistant coordinator.
Kevin Cheng as Summer Ha, Only You's photographer.
Natalie Tong as Ma Hiu-ching, Chong Sze-tim's daughter
Mak Cheung-ching as Chong Sze-chai, Phoebe's husband and co-owner of Only You.
Kristal Tin as Phoebe Szeto, the co-owner of Only You.

Awards and nominations

45th TVB Anniversary Awards 2011
 Nominated: Best Drama
 Nominated: Best Actress (Louise Lee)
 Nominated: Best Actress (Yoyo Mung)
 Nominated: My Favourite Female Character (Louise Lee)
 Nominated: My Favourite Female Character (Yoyo Mung)
 Nominated: Most Improved Male Artiste (Jason Chan)
 Nominated: Most Improved Male Artiste (Matt Yeung)

Viewership ratings

References

External links
Official TVB Website 
K for TVB English Synopsis

TVB dramas
2011 Hong Kong television series debuts
2011 Hong Kong television series endings